John Quenneville (born April 16, 1996) is a Canadian professional ice hockey player who is currently playing with the Belleville Senators of the American Hockey League (AHL). Quenneville was selected by the New Jersey Devils in the first round (30th overall) of the 2014 NHL Entry Draft.

Playing career

Junior
Quenneville was selected by the Brandon Wheat Kings in the 3rd round (54th overall) of the 2011 WHL Bantam Draft. He played with the Brandon Wheat Kings from the 2012–13 WHL season to 2015–16 WHL season.

While playing with the Wheat Kings, Quenneville was rated as a top prospect who was viewed as a possible first round selection heading into the 2014 NHL Entry Draft. He was eventually drafted 30th overall by the New Jersey Devils in the 2014 NHL Entry Draft.

Professional
On July 13, 2015, Quenneville signed a three-year entry level contract with the Devils, and after concluding his WHL career that season he subsequently joined the Albany Devils for the 2016–17 season. He made his NHL debut on December 1, 2016, against the Chicago Blackhawks. On January 5, 2017, Quennville was named to the 2017 AHL All-Star Classic, along with Joseph Blandisi. He was recalled to the NHL on March 15, 2017, and scored his first NHL goal in a 3–2 overtime win over the New York Rangers on March 21, 2017.

On June 22, 2019, Quenneville was traded to the Chicago Blackhawks in exchange for John Hayden. On June 28, the Blackhawks signed Quenneville to a two-year contract extension.

On July 21, 2021, Quenneville was selected from the Blackhawks at the 2021 NHL Expansion Draft by the Seattle Kraken. As a pending unrestricted free agent, Quenneville was not signed by the Kraken, and on August 10, 2021, he agreed to his first contract abroad in accepting a tryout arrangement with Swiss club, ZSC Lions of the National League (NL). Through making an initial positive impression, Quenneville converted his tryout into a one-year deal for the remainder of the 2021–22 season on September 5, 2021. He concluded his first European season, collected 20 goals and 37 points through 46 regular season games. 

Remaining in Europe, Quenneville as a free agent secured a contract with Swedish top flight club, Leksands IF of the Swedish Hockey League (SHL), on July 15, 2022. In the following 2022–23 season, Quenneville was limited through injury however registered 12 points through 19 regular season games with Leksands before opting for a release to return to North America.

On February 2, 2023, Quenneville returned to the AHL by signing for the remainder of the season with the Belleville Senators, the primary affiliate of the Ottawa Senators.

International play
As a 16-year-old, Quenneville was chosen to compete with the Canada Pacific squad at the 2013 World U-17 Hockey Challenge, and he helped Team Canada capture the bronze medal at the 2014 IIHF World U18 Championships.

Personal life
Quenneville's older brother Peter was drafted in the seventh round by the Columbus Blue Jackets in the 2013 NHL Entry Draft, and his younger brother  was drafted 200th overall in the 2016 NHL Entry Draft. Former NHL player and head coach Joel Quenneville is his first cousin, once-removed. Former NHL defenceman Johnny Boychuk is his uncle by marriage.

Career statistics

Regular season and playoffs

International

Awards and honours

References

External links
 

1996 births
Living people
Albany Devils players
Belleville Senators players
Binghamton Devils players
Brandon Wheat Kings players
Canadian ice hockey centres
Chicago Blackhawks players
Leksands IF players
Ice hockey people from Edmonton
National Hockey League first-round draft picks
New Jersey Devils draft picks
New Jersey Devils players
Rockford IceHogs (AHL) players
ZSC Lions players
Canadian expatriate ice hockey players in the United States
Canadian expatriate ice hockey players in Switzerland
Canadian expatriate ice hockey players in Sweden